Convention & Exhibition Center station; formerly Huizhanzhongxin station is an interchange station on Line 1 and Line 4 of the Shenzhen Metro. It opened on 28 December 2004. It is located under the junction of Fuhua Lu and Zhongxin Erlu in Futian District, Shenzhen, China. It gives access to Central Walk shopping mall, Link City, Wongtee Plaza, the Sheraton Hotel, the Shangri-La Hotel, and Shenzhen Convention and Exhibition Center.

Station layout

Exits

References

External links
 Shenzhen Metro Convention and Exhibition Center Station (Line 1) (Chinese)
 Shenzhen Metro Convention and Exhibition Center Station (Line 1) (English)
 Shenzhen Metro Convention and Exhibition Center Station (Line 4) (Chinese)
 Shenzhen Metro Convention and Exhibition Center Station (Line 4) (English)

Railway stations in Guangdong
Shenzhen Metro stations
Futian District
Railway stations in China opened in 2004
Railway stations located underground in China